Decimation (decem = "ten") was a form of  Roman military discipline in which every tenth man in a group was executed by members of his cohort. The discipline was used by senior commanders in the Roman army to punish units or large groups guilty of capital offences, such as cowardice, mutiny, desertion, and insubordination, and for pacification of rebellious legions. 

The word decimation is derived from Latin meaning "removal of a tenth". The procedure was an attempt to balance the need to punish serious offences with the realities of managing a large group of offenders.

Procedure
A cohort (roughly 480 soldiers) selected for punishment by decimation was divided into groups of ten. Each group drew lots (sortition), and the soldier on whom the lot of the shortest straw fell was executed by his nine comrades, often by stoning, clubbing, or stabbing. The remaining soldiers were often given rations of barley instead of wheat (the latter being the standard soldier's diet) for a few days, and required to bivouac outside the fortified security of the camp for some time. 

As the punishment fell by lot, all soldiers in a group sentenced to decimation were potentially liable for execution, regardless of individual degrees of fault, rank, or distinction.

Usage
The earliest documented decimation occurred in 471 BC during the Roman Republic's early wars against the Volsci and was recorded by Livy. In an incident where his army had been scattered, consul Appius Claudius Sabinus Regillensis had the culprits punished for desertion: centurions, standard-bearers and soldiers who had cast away their weapons were individually scourged and beheaded, while of the remainder, one in ten was chosen by lot and executed.

Polybius gives one of the first descriptions of the practice in the early 3rd century BC:
If ever these same things happen to occur among a large group of men... the officers reject the idea of bludgeoning or slaughtering all the men involved [as is the case with a small group or an individual]. Instead they find a solution for the situation which chooses by a lottery system sometimes five, sometimes eight, sometimes twenty of these men, always calculating the number in this group with reference to the whole unit of offenders so that this group forms one-tenth of all those guilty of cowardice. And these men who are chosen by lot are bludgeoned mercilessly in the manner described above.

The practice was also used by Alexander the Great against a corps of 6,000 men.

The practice was revived by Marcus Licinius Crassus in 71 BC during the Third Servile War against Spartacus, and some historical sources attribute part of Crassus' success to it. The total number of men killed through decimation is not known, but it varied on occasion between 1,000 from 10,000 men and 48–50 from a cohort of around 500 men. A specific instance saw 500 men selected by Crassus from the survivors of two legions which had broken and run in combat against the rebel slaves. They were divided into groups of ten, one of whom was chosen by lot regardless of actual behaviour in the battle. The nine remaining legionaries in each party were then forced to club their former comrade to death. The dual purpose intended was to stiffen discipline amongst the army at large and to demoralise the enemy.    

Julius Caesar threatened to decimate the 9th Legion during the war against Pompey, but never did.

Plutarch describes the process in his work Life of Antony.  After a defeat in Media:
Antony was furious and employed the punishment known as "decimation" on those who had lost their nerve. What he did was divide the whole lot of them into groups of ten, and then he killed one from each group, who was chosen by lot; the rest, on his orders were given barley rations instead of wheat.

Decimation was still being practised during the time of the Roman Empire, although it was very uncommon. Suetonius records that it was used by Emperor Augustus in 17 BC and later by Galba, while Tacitus records that Lucius Apronius used decimation to punish a full cohort of the III Augusta after their defeat by Tacfarinas in AD 20. G.R. Watson notes that "its appeal was to those obsessed with nimio amore antiqui moris" – that is, an excessive love for ancient customs – and notes, "Decimation itself, however, was ultimately doomed, for though the army might be prepared to assist in the execution of innocent slaves, professional soldiers could hardly be expected to cooperate in the indiscriminate execution of their own comrades." The emperor Macrinus instituted a less harsh centesimatio, the execution of every 100th man.

According to legend, the Theban Legion, led by Saint Maurice, was decimated in the third century AD. The legion had refused, to a man, to accede to an order of the emperor, and the process was repeated until none were left. They became known as the Martyrs of Agaunum.

The Eastern Roman Emperor Maurice forbade in his Strategikon the decimatio and other brutal punishments. According to him, punishments where the rank and file saw their comrades dying by the hands of their own brothers-in-arms could lead to a collapse of morale. Moreover, it could seriously deplete the manpower of the fighting unit.

Post-classical instances

17th century
Von Sparr's cuirassier regiment in Gottfried Heinrich Graf zu Pappenheim's corps fled the field during the Battle of Lützen (1632) during the Thirty Years' War. The imperial commander, Wallenstein, appointed a court martial, which directed the execution of the officer in command, Colonel Hagen, together with Lt Col Hofkirchen, ten other officers and five troopers. They were beheaded with the sword, while two men found guilty of looting the baggage were sentenced to a less honourable death, by hanging. The remaining troopers were decimated, one in every ten cavalrymen being hanged; the others were assembled beneath the gallows, beaten, branded and declared outlaws. Their standards were burned by an executioner after the emperor's monogram had been cut from the fabric.

Similarly, during the Battle of Breitenfeld (1642), near Leipzig, Colonel Madlo's cavalry regiment was the first that fled without striking a blow. This was followed by the massive flight of other cavalry units, an early turning point in the battle. It ended in a decisive victory for the Swedish Army under the command of Field Marshal Lennart Torstenson over an Imperial Army under Archduke Leopold Wilhelm of Austria and his deputy Ottavio Piccolomini, Duke of Amalfi. 

Leopold Wilhelm assembled a court-martial in Prague which sentenced the Madlo regiment to exemplary punishment. Six regiments, which had distinguished themselves in the battle, were assembled fully armed, and surrounded Madlo's regiment, which was severely rebuked for its cowardice and misconduct, and ordered to lay down its arms at the feet of General Piccolomini. When they had obeyed this command, their ensigns (flags) were torn in pieces; and the general, having mentioned the causes of their degradation, and erased the regiment from the register of the imperial troops, pronounced the sentence that had been agreed upon in the council of war, condemning the colonel, captains and lieutenants to be beheaded, the ensigns (junior officers) to be hanged, the soldiers to be decimated and the survivors to be driven in disgrace out of the army. 

Ninety men (chosen by rolling dice) were executed at Rokycany, in western Bohemia, now in the Czech Republic, on December 14, 1642 by Jan Mydlář (junior), the son of Jan Mydlář, the famous executioner from Prague. On the first day of the execution, the regiment's cords were broken by the executioner. On the second day, officers were beheaded and selected men hanged on the trees on the road from Rokycany to Litohlavy. Another version says that the soldiers were shot, and their bodies hanged from the trees. Their mass grave is said to be on the Black Mound in Rokycany, which commemorates the decimation to this day.

19th and 20th century
On September 3, 1866, during the Battle of Curuzu, during the Paraguayan War, the Paraguayan 10th Battalion fled without firing a shot. President Lopez ordered the decimation of the battalion, which was accordingly formed into line and every tenth man shot.

In 1914, in France, there was a case in which a company of Tunisian tirailleurs (colonial soldiers) refused an order to attack and was ordered decimated by the divisional commander. This involved the execution of ten men.

Italian general Luigi Cadorna allegedly applied decimation to underperforming units during World War I. However, the British military historian John Keegan records that his "judicial savagery" during the Battle of Caporetto took the form of the summary executions of individual stragglers rather than the formalized winnowing of entire detachments. Certainly one specific instance of actual decimation did occur in the Italian Army during the war, on May 26, 1916. This involved the execution of one in ten soldiers of a 120 strong company of the 141st Catanzaro Infantry Brigade, which had mutinied. Officers, carabinieri and non-mutinying soldiers had been killed during the outbreak.

During the suppression of the German Revolution, 29 men from the Volksmarinedivision were executed after 300 men turned up to receive their discharge papers and back pay.

Decimation can be also used to punish the enemy. In 1918, during the Finnish Civil War, White troops, after conquering the Red city of Varkaus, summarily executed around 80 captured Reds in what became known as the Lottery of Huruslahti. According to some accounts, the Whites ordered all the captured Reds to assemble in a single row on the ice of Lake Huruslahti, selected every tenth prisoner, and executed him on the spot. The selection was not entirely random though, as some prisoners (primarily Red leaders) were specifically selected for execution and other individuals were intentionally spared.

At one point of the Battle of Stalingrad in the Second World War, the commander of the Soviet 64th Rifle Division resorted to decimation as a punishment for cowardice.

Current usage of the word
The word decimation in English is often used to refer to an extreme reduction in the number of a population or force or an overall sense of destruction and ruin.

See also
Fustuarium
Lachesis – measured the thread of life with her rod; her Roman equivalent was Decima (the tenth)

References

External links
Decimatio, article in Smith's Dictionary of Greek and Roman Antiquities
Did Julius Caesar Decimate a Legion?
Michael M. Sage, The Republican Roman Army: A Sourcebook
Jo-Ann Shelton, As the Romans Did: A Sourcebook in Roman Social History

Ancient Roman military punishments
Capital punishment